Březová nad Svitavou (until 1949 Březová) is a town in Svitavy District in the Pardubice Region of the Czech Republic. It has about 1,600 inhabitants.

Geography
Březová nad Svitavou lies on the stretch of the Svitava river which historically marked the border between Bohemia and Moravia.

History
Březová nad Svitavou was founded in around 1300. In 1497, it was promoted to a town by Vladislaus II.

Notable people
Karl Kořistka (1825–1906), geographer, cartographer and mathematician

References

External links

Cities and towns in the Czech Republic
Populated places in Svitavy District